is a Japanese footballer currently playing as a centre-back for Singapore Premier League club Young Lions.

Career statistics

Club
.

Notes

References

External links

1999 births
Living people
Association football people from Osaka Prefecture
Kwansei Gakuin University alumni
Japanese footballers
Association football defenders
J3 League players
Cerezo Osaka players
Cerezo Osaka U-23 players
Albirex Niigata Singapore FC players
Japanese expatriate footballers
Japanese expatriate sportspeople in Singapore
Expatriate footballers in Singapore